Chionodraco myersi, the Myers's icefish, is a species of marine ray-finned fish belonging to the family Channichthyidae, the crocodile icefishes. It is found in the Southern Ocean.

Taxonomy
Chionodraco myersi was first formally described  in 1960 by the American ichthyologists Hugh Hamilton DeWitt and James Chase Tyler II with the type locality given as off Terra Nova Bay in the southwestern Ross Sea. The specific name honours the American ichthyologist George S. Myers in recognition of the support he gave to the Stanford Antarctic Biological Research Program of 1958-1959, on which the type was obtained.

Description
Chionodraco myersi  has a low knob on its snout rather than a spine and lacks the roughened ridges above the eyes shown by C. hamatus. The dorsal fins have between 5 and 7 spines and 36-40 soft rays while the anal fin has 34-37 soft rays. This species is pale greyish with a white belly and has five to six dark cross-bars on each side of its body. The cheeks have two dark stripes. The males and females can be differentiated by the male having a significantly higher first dorsal fin. Large males tend to be darker than similar-sized females, and the second dorsal fins and anal fins of mature males can be dusky in color as opposed to the fully black fins of mature females (however, the other fins are pale regardless of sex and maturity).

Distribution and habitat

Biology
Chionodraco myersi adults have a diet consisting of fish, particularly the Antarctic silverfish (Pleuragramma antarctica) and euphausiids (krill) (e.g. Euphasia crystallorphia). Sexual dimorphism can be seen in the body color.  

The genome of this species was sequenced in 2019.

Fisheries
Chionodraco myersi is one of the most abundant species of crocodile icefish in the Ross Sea; however, it is of no interest to commercial fisheries.

References

myersi
Fish described in 1960
Taxa named by H. H. DeWitt